Jean-Loïc Galle (born 26 September 1959) is General Director of Opérations and Performance of Thales.

Education 
Jean-Loïc Galle holds a master's degree in engineering from École Centrale Paris (class of 1982) and an MBA from INSEAD (class of 1991). He also completed executive training at the Centre des Hautes Etudes de l'Armement (CHEAr), a French institute for defense studies.

Career 
 2003 - 2007 : CEO of ThalesRaytheonSystems
 2010 - 2012 : Senior VP of Thales Air Operations Division
 2012 -          : President and CEO of Thales Alenia Space
 2020 - Directeur général Opérations and Performance of Thales.

Distinctions 
 Knight of the French Legion of Honour (2013)

References

External links
 

1959 births
Living people
French business executives
French chief executives
Thales Group people
École Centrale Paris alumni
INSEAD alumni
Chevaliers of the Légion d'honneur
People from Fougères
French engineers